Ready to Fly  may refer to:

 Ready to Fly (radio control), radio-controlled airplanes or helicopters that are supplied fully built

Film
 Ready to Fly (film), a 2012 documentary film on women's ski jumping

Music
 Ready to Fly (FFH album) (2003)
 Ready to Fly (Jamie Grace album) (2014)
 Ready to Fly (The Verlaines album) (1991)
 "Ready to Fly" (Amy Pearson song), a song by Amy Pearson
 "Ready to Fly", a 2004 song by Richard Marx from My Own Best Enemy
 "Ready to Fly" (Didrick song), a song by Didrick featuring Adam Young of Owl City
 "Ready to Fly" a single by Sub Focus and Dimension (2022)